Babette Cole (10 September 1950 – 15 January 2017) was an English children's writer and illustrator.

Life and career
Cole was born on Jersey in the Channel Islands. She attended the Canterbury College of Art (now the University for the Creative Arts) and received first-class BA Honours. She worked on such children's programmes as Bagpuss (working with Oliver Postgate and Peter Firmin) and Jackanory for BBC television.

As a children's writer, Cole created more than 150 picture books.  Her best-seller Doctor Dog has been adapted as a successful children's cartoon series. Much of her work is earthy comedy, having titles like The Smelly Book, The Hairy Book, The Slimy Book and The Silly Book.

She spent her time writing, visiting schools and travelling. After a short illness she died on 15 January 2017, aged 66.

Awards

Cole won the Kurt Maschler Award, or the Emil, for Drop Dead (Jonathan Cape, 1996), which she wrote and illustrated. The former award from Maschler Publications and Booktrust annually recognised one British "work of imagination for children, in which text and illustration are integrated so that each enhances and balances the other."

She was one of several commended runners-up for the Kate Greenaway Medal, the annual Library Association award for illustration in British children's books, for both Princess Smartypants (1986) and Prince Cinders (1987).

Cole won many other awards for her books: 
 Nungu and the Hippopotamus (1980) — Children's Picture Book of The Year; Children's Books of the Year; Child Study Association of America
 The Wind in the Willows Pop-Up Book (1983) — New York Public Library Children's Books
 Princess Smartypants (1986) — British Library Association (BLA) 
 Prince Cinders (1987) — BLA Annabell Fargeon Award
 Drop Dead (1996) — The British Book Trust

See also

Notes

References

Other sources
  at Tameside Library
 Babette Cole at Puffin Books (inconsistent service)

External links
  
  
  

1950 births
2017 deaths
British children's book illustrators
English children's writers
English illustrators
British women illustrators
Writers from the Channel Islands
Alumni of the University for the Creative Arts
British women children's writers
20th-century English writers
20th-century English women writers
21st-century English writers
21st-century English women writers